Goalpost Pictures is an Australian film production company founded and run by Rosemary Blight, Ben Grant, Kylie du Fresne, and Cass O’Connor.

History
The 2007 suburban comedy Clubland, directed by Cherie Nowlan, debuted at the 2009 Sundance Film Festival, and was picked up for US distribution by Warner Bros. under the title Introducing The Dwights.

In 2009, Goalpost produced The Eternity Man, a film opera depicting the true story of World War I veteran Arthur Stace, who roamed the backstreets of Sydney chalking the single word "Eternity" across the pavements. The film, which was released in conjunction with ABC TV and Channel 4 UK, earned the Rose d'Or award for outstanding performing arts program.

Other credits include Lockie Leonard Series One and Two, which were screened on Channel 9 and based on Tim Winton's book series. Lockie Leonard won 'Best Children's Series' at the 2009 TV Week Logie Awards as well as the 2007 AFI for 'Best Children's Drama Series'. It was also picked up in the UK by BBC 2. Further productions include Scorched, a television and cross-platform event that won the 2009 Digital Emmy Award, and James Bogle's Closed for Winter, starring Natalie Imbruglia.

Goalpost Pictures executive-produced the 2010 Australian-French film The Tree, adapted from the book Our Father Who Art In The Tree, by Australian author Judy Pascoe. Starring Charlotte Gainsbourg, the film was selected to be the closing night film at the 2010 Cannes Film Festival. In 2011 they produced Tony Tilse's event horror-thriller telemovie Panic At Rock Island for The Nine Network and NBC Universal.

Goalpost Pictures received the "Production Business of the Year" award in the 2013 Screen Producers Australia Awards.

Governance
 Goalpost is led by founding members, producers Rosemary Blight, Ben Grant, Kylie du Fresne, and Cass O'Connor.

Filmography

Awards

References

External links

Australian film studios